The following is a partial list of notable residents, past and present, from Eugene, Oregon, United States. A separate list of people from Oregon is available.

Artists 

 Maude Kerns, artist
 Taravat Talepasand, artist
 Olga Volchkova, cast-glass sculptor, icon painter

Athletes 

 Danny Ainge, North Eugene High School (1977), NBA player, coach and team executive
 Jon Anderson, Olympian, 1973 Boston Marathon winner
 Alex Brink, Canadian Football League quarterback
 Gregory Byrne, Athletics Director at Mississippi State University
 Todd Christensen, Sheldon High School (1974), Los Angeles Raiders NFL tight end
 Brian Conklin, professional basketball player for Limoges CSP of the LNB Pro A
 Mary Decker, middle-distance runner, two-time world champion, member of National Track and Field Hall of Fame
 Bill Dellinger, middle-distance runner and University of Oregon coach, Olympic bronze medalist
 Ashton Eaton, decathlete, five-time world champion, two-time Olympic gold medalist 
 Tim Euhus, Churchill High School, NFL tight end
 Dan Fouts, University of Oregon (1970–72), San Diego Chargers (NFL) quarterback, Pro Football Hall of Famer, TV commentator
 Joey Harrington, University of Oregon (1998–2001), NFL quarterback
 Jamey Harris, 1998 national champion, 1,500 meters
Justin Herbert, Sheldon High School (Oregon), University of Oregon (2016–19), Los Angeles Chargers (NFL) quarterback, Rose Bowl MVP
 Cyrus Hostetler, javelin thrower, Pan American Games silver medalist 
 Luke Jackson, University of Oregon, NBA player, basketball coach at Northwest Christian University
 Nate Jaqua, South Eugene High School (2000), Seattle Sounders striker
 Jordan Kent, Churchill High School, University of Oregon three-sport star, son of UO coach Ernie Kent, wide receiver Seattle Seahawks (NFL)
 Matt LaBounty, Oregon, 49ers, Packers, and Seahawks NFL defensive end
 Keith Lewis, University of Oregon, San Francisco 49ers free safety
 Marcus Mariota, University of Oregon (2012–14), Heisman Trophy Winner, Tennessee Titans quarterback (2015–19), Las Vegas Raiders quarterback (2020–present)
 Casey Martin, professional golfer, University of Oregon golf coach
 Bill McChesney, University of Oregon distance runner, 1980 Olympic team member
 Quintin Mikell, Willamette High School, Philadelphia Eagles (NFL) defensive back
 Chris Miller, Sheldon High School (1983), University of Oregon (1983–86), NFL quarterback
 Kenny Moore, North Eugene High School (1962), University of Oregon (1963–66), runner, Olympic marathoner, sportswriter (Sports Illustrated), screenwriter (Without Limits), author (Bowerman and the Men of Oregon), actor in track movie Personal Best
 Haloti Ngata, University of Oregon (2006), Baltimore Ravens, Detroit Lions (NFL) defensive tackle
 Aaron Olson, professional cyclist
 Steve Prefontaine, University of Oregon (1973), Olympic runner
 Jeff Quinney, 2000 U.S. amateur golf champion, PGA player
 Ahmad Rashad (formerly Bobby Moore), University of Oregon football player (1969–71), NFL receiver, NBC sportscaster
 Dathan Ritzenhein, distance runner, 2008 USA men's Olympic marathon team
 Marla Runyan, distance runner, five-time Paralympic Games gold medalist
 Alberto Salazar, distance runner, marathoner, coach until he was banned for life
 Onterrio Smith, University of Oregon, NFL running back
 David Vobora, Churchill High School, NFL linebacker
 Josh Wilcox, University of Oregon, NFL tight end
 Kailee Wong, North Eugene High School, NFL linebacker

Authors 

 David Bischoff, science fiction author
 Richard Brautigan, author
 George Hitchcock (1914–2010), poet and publisher of the literary journal Kayak
 Nina Kiriki Hoffman, author
 Ken Kesey, author
 Damon Knight, author
 Grace Llewellyn, author of The Teenage Liberation Handbook
 Laurie Notaro, author
 Jerry Oltion, author, astronomer, and inventor
 Chuck Palahniuk, author
 Casey Plett, writer
 Bruce Holland Rogers, author
 William L. Sullivan, author of outdoor guide books
 John Varley, science fiction author
 Ray Vukcevich, fantasy and literary author
 Bob Welch, author, columnist for The Register-Guard
 Leslie What, author
 Kate Wilhelm, author
 Anthony Wynn, author

Entertainment
 Andy Andrist, comedian 
 Brandon Beemer, actor
 Dan Carlin, podcaster and author, current resident of Eugene, Oregon
 Esther K. Chae, actress
 William De Los Santos, screenwriter for 2002 Eugene-based film Spun
 Demetri Goritsas, actor
 Howard Hesseman, actor
 Christopher Judge, actor (Stargate SG-1), as Doug Judge; football star at the University of Oregon in the mid-1980s 
 Rose McGowan, actress, grew up in Eugene
 Austin O'Brien, actor, costarred with Arnold Schwarzenegger in Last Action Hero as well as appearing in many other films and TV shows
 Eric Christian Olsen, actor
 Rebecca Schaeffer, actress in My Sister Sam
 David Ogden Stiers, actor on the television series M*A*S*H; was in the first graduating class of North Eugene High School (1960)
 Eric A. Stillwell, screenwriter and producer
 Caitlin Wachs, actress
 Jenny Wade, actress, Churchill High School alumnus
 Craig Wasson, actor
 Puddles the Duck, mascot, dancer 
 Bryce Zabel, Hollywood writer and producer; chairman Academy of Television Arts & Sciences

Music 

 Frank Black, musician, Pixies singer and guitarist
 Tracy Bonham, musician
 Isaac Brock, musician, Modest Mouse, Ugly Casanova
 Andie Case, musician
 Robert Cray, musician
 Anna Gilbert, musician
 Tim Hardin, musician
 Megan Marie Hart, operatic soprano
 Evynne Hollens, musician
 Peter Hollens, musician
 Kelly Keagy, musician (drummer for Night Ranger)
 Mat Kearney, musician
 Daniel Levitin, neuroscientist, author, musician, attended University of Oregon 1992–1996
 Mark Lindsay, musician, lead singer of Paul Revere and the Raiders
 Halie Loren, singer-songwriter
 Courtney Love, frontwoman of alternative rock band Hole, lived in Eugene as a child with her mother
 Shawn McDonald, musician
 Frank Navetta (1962–2008), original bassist for punk band Descendents; born in California, moved to Eugene in 1985 and lived there until his death
 Steve Perry, musician, lead singer, songwriter Cherry Poppin' Daddies
 RJD2, music producer, singer and musician
 Rock and Roll Soldiers, band
 Curtis Salgado, Willamette High School alumnus (1971), blues musician
 Dan Schmid, musician, Cherry Poppin' Daddies/Frank Black bassist
 Corin Tucker, musician, Sleater-Kinney
 Theresa Becker Wayman, musician; singer-songwriter; actor; guitarist and vocalist of the indie rock band Warpaint
 Mason Williams, musician, writer
 Paul Wright, musician
 Michelle Zauner, musician, lead vocalist and songwriter for Japanese Breakfast; author of her memoir, Crying in H Mart

Others

 Garner Ted Armstrong, radio and television evangelist
 Herbert W. Armstrong, evangelist and author
 John Brombaugh, pipe organ builder
 Edgar Buchanan, dentist, actor
 Robert Lee Burns, reformed convict
 James Dutton, U.S. Air Force test pilot and NASA astronaut
 Neil Goldschmidt, politician, Mayor of Portland, U.S. Secretary of Transportation
 Jacob Hacker, political scientist
 Creed C. Hammond, Major General and Chief of the National Guard Bureau
 Jack Herer, cannabis activist, author
 Terri Irwin, naturalist, wife of Crocodile Hunter Steve Irwin
 Phil Knight, co-founder of Nike, Inc.
 Eugene Lazowski, Polish physician, saved 8,000 people by creating a fake typhus epidemic in World War II
 Mickey Loomis, Willamette High School alumnus; general manager, New Orleans Saints, National Football League
 Stanley G. Love, astronaut
 Georgia Mason, botanist and herbarium curator
 Rich McKay, president and CEO of the Atlanta Falcons
 Wayne Morse, U.S. Senator
 Paul Pierson, political scientist
 Marty Ravellette, armless hero
 Paul Martin Simon, U.S. Senator from Illinois
 Wendell Wood, conservationist 
 Don Z. Zimmerman, Brigadier General, first Dean of Faculty at the U.S. Air Force Academy
 John Zerzan, anarcho-primitivist writer, philosopher, activist

See also 
 List of people from Oregon
 Lists of Oregon-related topics

References

 
Eugene, Oregon
Eugene